Melvyn Ong Su Kiat  (born 1975) is a Singaporean lieutenant-general who has been serving as Chief of Defence Force since 2018. Prior to his appointment as Chief of Defence Force, he served as Chief of Army between 2015 and 2018.

Education
Ong was educated at Anglo-Chinese School (Independent) and National Junior College, before being awarded the Singapore Armed Forces (SAF) Overseas Scholarship in 1994 to study at the London School of Economics, where he graduated with a Bachelor of Science with second class honours degree. He also completed a Master of Science degree in economics at the London School of Economics in 1998.

Ong attended the Indonesian Army Command and General Staff College in Bandung in 2005. He also completed the United States Army's Infantry Officer Course in Fort Benning, Georgia in 1998.

Military career
Ong enlisted in the Singapore Armed Forces (SAF) in January 1994 and was commissioned as an infantry officer in October that year. He has held various appointments in the SAF, including the Commander of the 7th Singapore Infantry Brigade from 2010 to 2011, and Head of the Joint Plans and Transformation Department. In 2011, he led the Singapore team which assisted in rescue operations and provided humanitarian aid to the victims of the 2011 Christchurch earthquake in New Zealand, and helped to establish the Changi Regional Humanitarian Assistance and Disaster Relief Coordination Centre in 2014. He also chaired the executive committee of the 2015 National Day Parade. He served as Chief Guards Officer from 18 June 2014 to 14 August 2015.

Ong succeeded Perry Lim as the Chief of the Singapore Army on 14 August 2015.

Ong was promoted to the rank of Major General on 1 July 2016.

Ong stepped down as COA on 21 March 2018 and is appointed as CDF on 23 March 2018.

Ong was promoted to the rank of Lieutenant General on 1 July 2018.

Non-military career
In addition to his career in the SAF, Ong is also serving in the Singapore Administrative Service under a dual-career scheme. Between 2013 and 2014, he was the Deputy Chief Executive Officer of the Early Childhood Development Agency, which was jointly created by the Ministry of Social and Family Development and Ministry of Education.

Awards and decorations
Lieutenant-General Ong has received the following awards:

Personal life
Ong is married to Nicole Lynn McCully and they have three children.

References

Living people
Singaporean people of Chinese descent
Chiefs of Defence Force (Singapore)
Chiefs of the Singapore Army
Alumni of the London School of Economics
Anglo-Chinese School alumni
National Junior College alumni
Recipients of the Pingat Pentadbiran Awam
Recipients of the Long Service Medal (Military) (Singapore)
1975 births